XHELG-FM is a radio station on 95.5 FM in León, Guanajuato. XHELG is owned by Promomedios and carries a Spanish oldies format known as LG La Grande.

History
XHLG began as XELG-AM, with a concession awarded on January 31, 1946. It operated on 680 kHz with 10 kW day and 5 kW night until the AM-FM migration.

References

Radio stations in Guanajuato
Radio stations established in 1946